William Henry Miller (date of birth and death unknown; christened 24 December 1817) was an English first-class cricketer.

Miller made six first-class cricket appearances in first-class cricket, all for the Surrey Club. His debut came in 1851 against the Marylebone Cricket Club at Lord's, with his final appearance coming against the same opposition in 1853 at The Oval. He scored 87 runs in his six matches, with a top score of 31. His brother, Frederick, was also a first-class cricketer.

References

External links

1817 births
Year of death unknown
People from Clapham
English cricketers
Surrey Club cricketers